The Chinese Giant Solar Telescope (CGST) is a proposed solar telescope in China. CGST will be an infrared and optical solar telescope. Its spatial resolution is equivalent to an 8 m-diameter telescope, and the light-gathering power equivalent to a 5 m-diameter telescope. The major scientific goal is to get precise measurement of solar vector magnetic field with high spatial resolution. It is expected to cost US$90 million.

See also

 List of solar telescopes

References

Solar telescopes
Chinese telescopes
Proposed telescopes